Microptecticus is a genus of flies in the family Stratiomyidae.

Species
Microptecticus ambiguus Lindner, 1966
Microptecticus dimidiatus Lindner, 1936
Microptecticus magnicornis (Lindner, 1936)
Microptecticus nigricoxa (Lindner, 1936)

References

Stratiomyidae
Brachycera genera
Taxa named by Erwin Lindner
Diptera of Africa